Agustina Roth (born 18 July 2001) is an Argentine BMX rider.

Roth competed at the 2018 Youth Olympics where she won a gold medal in the mixed BMX freestyle park event. She won a bronze medal at the Cycling at the 2019 Pan American Games in the women's BMX freestyle event.

References

2001 births
Living people
Argentine female cyclists
BMX riders
Cyclists at the 2019 Pan American Games
Pan American Games medalists in cycling
Pan American Games bronze medalists for Argentina
Cyclists at the 2018 Summer Youth Olympics
Youth Olympic gold medalists for Argentina
Medalists at the 2019 Pan American Games
21st-century Argentine women